Oslo International Church Music Festival is a church music festival held every year in March in Oslo, Norway.

History 
The festival, founded in 2000 by artistic and festival director Bente Johnsrud is cured by a non-profit organization of the same name, and staged under the patronage of Mette-Marit, Crown Princess of Norway. Churches such as the Medieval church Gamle Aker are used as Concert halls.

References

External links 

Drømmestipendet
   
Music festivals established in 2000
Music festivals in Norway

Christian music festivals
Music festivals in Oslo
Culture in Oslo
2000 establishments in Norway
Winter events in Norway